Bogjurgan Hill is an elevated landform at the southern verge of the Fetteresso Forest in Aberdeenshire, Scotland. Historical features in this region of Kincardineshire include Fetteresso Castle, Drumtochty Castle and Muchalls Castle.

See also
Drumtochty Forest

References
 United Kingdom Ordnance Survey Map Landranger 45, Stonehaven and Banchory, 1:50,000 scale, 2004

Line notes

Mountains and hills of Aberdeenshire